, better known by his pen name , was a Japanese manga artist from Tone, Ibaraki, Japan. In 2000, he won an honorable mention in the 55th Weekly Shōnen Champion "Newcomer Award", sponsored by Akita Shoten, for his work Twin Burner. His debut work Muteki Kanban Musume was published from 2002 to 2006. Sadogawa committed suicide by hanging on August 13, 2013 at age 34. He was serializing his manga Amane Atatameru at the time of his death.

Works
 (2002–2006, 17 volumes)
 (2006–2007, 5 volumes)
Punisher (2008–2009, 7 volumes)
 (2010–2012, 13 volumes)
 (2012–2013, 2 volumes, unfinished)

References

External links

1979 births
2013 suicides
Artists who committed suicide
Manga artists from Ibaraki Prefecture
Suicides by hanging in Japan